The Frank Packer Plate is an Australian Turf Club Group 3  Thoroughbred horse race for three-year-olds at set weights run over a distance of 2000 metres at Randwick Racecourse, Sydney, Australia during the Autumn Carnival. Total prizemoney is A$160,000

History

Those three year old gallopers who were not able to participate in the Australian Derby or in the Australian Oaks held over a distance of 2400 metres often take part in this middle distance event.

During recent times the race has been held on the last day of the ATC Autumn Carnival.

Name

The race is named in honour of Sir Douglas Frank Hewson Packer, who was a media proprietor and former committeeman of the Australian Jockey Club for 12 years.

Grade
1980–1990 - Group 2
1991 onwards - Group 3

Winners

 2022 - Verona
 2021 - Senor Toba
 2020 - Kinane
 2019 - The Chosen One
 2018 - Higher Ground 
 2017 - Mongolian Wolf 
 2016 - He's Our Rokkii
 2015 - Hi World
 2014 - Arabian Gold
 2013 - Usainity
 2012 - Fat Al
 2011 - Shootoff
 2010 - Dariana
 2009 - Yallingup
 2008 - Rockwood
 2007 - Carnegie House
 2006 - Dream Machine
 2005 - Afraah
 2004 - Red Terror
 2003 - Clangalang
 2002 - Arlington Road
 2001 - Spurred On
 2000 - Freemason
 1999 - Franklin River
 1998 - Dodge
 1997 - Might and Power
 1996 - Mr Piper
 1995 - Juggler
 1994 - Espinosa
 1993 - Play Or Pay
 1992 - In The Event
 1991 - Bold Rancher
 1990 - Stargazer
 1989 - Royal Pardon
 1988 - Serestrina
 1987 - Never Quit
 1986 - Swift Cheval
 1985 - Spritely Native
 1984 - Pleasant Star
 1983 - Chiamara
 1982 - Dalmacia
 1981 - Shaybisc
 1980 - Lauriat

See also
 List of Australian Group races
 Group races

References

External links 
First three placegetters Frank Packer Plate (ATC)

Horse races in Australia